Andrea Beduschi (born 25 February 1992) is an Italian footballer.

Biography
Born in Treviglio, in the Province of Bergamo, Lombardy, Beduschi started his career at AlbinoLeffe, which also from the same province. In 2011, he was signed by SPAL in a co-ownership deal.
 In June 2012 AlbinoLeffe bought back Beduschi. On 29 August 2012 Beduschi and former AlbinoLeffe team-mate Malomo, were signed by Prato in another co-ownership deals, from AlbinoLeffe and Roma respectively. In June 2013 AlbinoLeffe bought back Beduschi.

In summer 2014 Beduschi was signed by Monza. On 22 January 2015 Beduschi was signed by Lecce.

After not playing in the 2018–19 season, on 23 August 2019 he signed a 1-year contract with Fano. On 2 January 2020, his Fano contract was terminated by mutual consent.

References

External links
 AIC profile (data by football.it) 
 

Italian footballers
U.C. AlbinoLeffe players
S.P.A.L. players
A.C. Prato players
A.C. Monza players
U.S. Lecce players
Alma Juventus Fano 1906 players
Serie B players
Serie C players
Association football central defenders
People from Treviglio
Footballers from Lombardy
1992 births
Living people